Geoffrey Page Shaw (born 12 October 1967) is an Australian politician who represented Frankston in the Victorian Legislative Assembly from 2010 to 2014, initially as a member of the Parliamentary Liberal Party until 6 March 2013, and then subsequently as an independent politician. On 17 March 2014 Shaw resigned as a member of the Liberal Party in advance of moves to expel him as a member of the party.

Charges were brought against Shaw in September 2013, were withdrawn by prosecutors on 3 December, and referred to the Legislative Assembly's Privileges Committee. Shaw's suspension followed a period of political instability in the Victorian Parliament.

On 12 October 2022 United Australia Party founder Clive Palmer announced that Shaw would lead the party's ticket for the 2022 Victorian state election and would run as a candidate for the Victorian Legislative Council in the Northern Victoria Region. Shaw cited frustration with the current Labor government and "the leadership of Daniel Andrews" as reasons for returning to state politics.

Education
Shaw attended John Paul College in Frankston, Victoria, graduating in 1985. Shaw attended Monash University where he attained a Bachelor of Business Accounting in 1988 and entered his own small business as a certified accountant and financial planner.

Political career

Liberal politician
Shaw entered politics at the 2010 Victorian state election where he defeated the incumbent Labor member Alistair Harkness.

In April 2011, Shaw wrote to a constituent suggesting "his desire to love who he wanted was as illegitimate as a dangerous driver wanting to speed or a child molester wanting to molest". The constituent had written to Shaw objecting to the government's renewal of religious organisations' exemption under anti-discrimination legislation.

In June 2011 Shaw admitted that he had been charged with assault in 1992 while working as a nightclub bouncer. Premier of Victoria Ted Baillieu asked for an explanation, and Shaw assured him and the Government that he was fined and placed on a good behaviour bond, but no conviction was recorded. In August 2011 Shaw was involved in a roadside fight in his electorate; it was alleged that he was involved in a conversation between a police officer and another driver, with an exchange of words developing into a physical altercation, with injuries to the other driver.

In May 2012, it was alleged that Shaw's parliamentary car was used for businessrelated to the hardware factory. Shaw claimed his staff had used the vehicle without his knowledge, however several whistleblowers said they remembered Shaw driving the car himself. Baillieu announced he had referred the case to the Speaker of the Victorian Legislative Assembly and the Department of Parliamentary Services to examine the use of Shaw's parliamentary entitlements. Geoff Shaw was cleared of charges after a full investigation by the Victorian Police and DPP. Charges were laid after the Labor Party requested the Police to investigate.

Independent politician
On 6 March 2013 Shaw resigned from the parliamentary Liberal Party, announcing that he would sit in the Legislative Assembly on the crossbenches as an independent politician. In the wake of the release of secret police tapes, Shaw refused to commit to supporting the government if Baillieu remained Premier.  Baillieu subsequently resigned as Premier the following day. Ports Minister Denis Napthine succeeded Baillieu as Premier and stated that Shaw would not be endorsed by the Liberal Party as a candidate for the 2014 state election.

On 17 September 2013 Victoria Police announced that Shaw had been charged with 23 counts of obtaining financial benefit by deception and one charge of misconduct in public office. On 3 December the Department of Public Prosecutions announced that it had dropped all charges against Shaw.

On 15 October 2013 Shaw was involved in a scuffle on the front steps of Parliament House. His arrival for Question Time coincided with a protest by taxi drivers in front of the House.

On 28 November 2013 Australian media reported that Premier Napthine had 'secretly assisted' Shaw to draft a Private Member's Bill to change state abortion legislation. Napthine refuted the allegations and stated his Government had no plans to change abortion laws, nor would he support any such change. Shaw reportedly planned to introduce the bill before the 2014 state election. In June 2014 Napthine stated:"...that while I am Premier of this state, I will not allow Mr Shaw to introduce any legislation seeking to change the abortion laws in Victoria."

Initial indications were that both the Labor state opposition and the Napthine government would seek to evict Shaw from the Victorian Parliament due to misuse of parliamentary privilege. On 11 June 2014 following an extended debate, the Members of the Victorian Legislative Assembly were asked to discipline Shaw by expelling him from Parliament. Following a division of the assembly that was deadlocked 42 all, with Shaw absent from the floor of the chamber for the debate, the speaker Christine Fyffe used her casting vote to defeat the motion. A subsequent motion was proposed by a Liberal member that "...the Member for Frankston be suspended from the service of this House for eleven sitting days." The motion was carried without division. Shaw was required to pay his fine by 2 September or face expulsion.

Return to state politics, United Australia Party candidate

On 12 October 2022 United Australia Party founder Clive Palmer announced that Shaw would lead the party's ticket for the 2022 Victorian state election and would run as a candidate for the Victorian Legislative Council in the Northern Victoria Region. Shaw cited frustration with the current Labor government and "the leadership of Daniel Andrews" as reasons for returning to state politics.

Personal life

Shaw was married to Sally, and they have four children. The couple separated in 2011. He married Bianca in 2014.

Shaw is an active Christian.  He is a member of Peninsula City Church, a megachurch in Frankston.  He once told 7.30, "I'm a Christian first and an MP is me—just what I do." In his maiden speech to the Victorian parliament, he acknowledged "the original owner of the land on which we stand—God, the Creator, the God of Abraham, Isaac and Jacob, the God of the Bible."

References

External links

1967 births
21st-century Australian politicians
Australian accountants
Australian Pentecostals
Australian people convicted of assault
Independent members of the Parliament of Victoria
Liberal Party of Australia members of the Parliament of Victoria
Living people
Members of the Victorian Legislative Assembly
Political scandals in Australia
Monash University alumni
Security guards
Politicians from Queensland